The Conference of the Dominican Episcopate (Spanish: Conferencia del Episcopado Dominicano, CED) is the body of the Catholic Church in the Dominican Republic. In 1954 arose the first Episcopal National Commission of the Dominican Republic, which is now officially called with the current name since September 22, 1962, when the Holy See approved its statutes. The first plenary meeting of the CED met in 1963, and the episcopal commissions were created in 1966.

The main bodies that make up are: the Plenary Assembly, the Permanent Council, its Secretary General, 16 committee and a national ecclesiastical court.

The CED is a member of the Latin American Episcopal Conference.

List of presidents of the Bishops' Conference:
 1958–1961: Ricardo Pittini, Archbishop of Santo Domingo
 1961–1979: Octavio Beras Rojas, Archbishop of Santo Domingo
 1979–1981: Juan Antonio Santana Flores, Archbishop of Santiago de los Caballeros
 1981–1984: Hugo Eduardo Polanco Brito, Archbishop of Nuestra Señora de la Altagracia en Higüey
 1984–2002: Nicolás de Jesús López Rodríguez, Archbishop of Santo Domingo
 2002–2008: Ramón Benito de la Rosa y Carpio, Bishop of Nuestra Señora de la Altagracia en Higüey and Archbishop of Santiago de los Caballeros
 2008–2017: Nicolás de Jesús López Rodríguez, Archbishop of Santo Domingo
 2017–2020 Diómedes Espinal de León, Bishop of Mao-Monti Cristi
 2020–2023: Freddy Antonio de Jesús Bretón Martínez, Archbishop of Santiago de los Caballeros

See also
Catholic Church in the Dominican Republic

References

External links
 Conferencia del Episcopado Dominicano

Dominican
Catholic Church in the Dominican Republic

it:Chiesa_cattolica_nella_Repubblica_Dominicana#Conferenza_episcopale